Drosophila puberula is a species of fly in the subgenus Dudaica.

References 

puberula
Insects described in 2018